The red-collared babbler (Turdoides rufocinctus), also known as the red-collared mountain-babbler, is a passerine bird in the family Leiothrichidae.  It is found in Burundi, Democratic Republic of the Congo, Rwanda, and Uganda.  Its natural habitat is subtropical or tropical moist montane forests.  It is threatened by habitat loss.

The red-collared babbler was moved from the genus Kupeornis to Turdoides based on the results of a molecular phylogenetic study published in 2018.

References

Collar, N. J. & Robson, C. 2007. Family Timaliidae (Babblers)  pp. 70 – 291 in; del Hoyo, J., Elliott, A. & Christie, D.A. eds. Handbook of the Birds of the World, Vol. 12. Picathartes to Tits and Chickadees. Lynx Edicions, Barcelona.

red-collared babbler
Birds of Sub-Saharan Africa
red-collared babbler
Taxonomy articles created by Polbot
Taxobox binomials not recognized by IUCN